Violet Grey is a Los Angeles based luxury beauty products retailer and content site founded in 2013 by Cassandra Grey. The company combines magazine style content and shopping for beauty products where they stringently evaluate each SKU on the site. Violet Grey hosts a magazine style blog called the Violet Files, where beauty insiders and celebrities discuss the products they use. In March 2021 this was presented as a 16-question interview with Virgil Abloh

Collaborations
Violet Grey has partnered with Jasmine Tookes, Melanie Griffith, January Jones, Kim Kardashian, and Rosie Huntington-Whiteley.

Emma Roberts had a Violet Grey photoshoot when she was six months pregnant.

References 

Beauty stores